The Monona Township Culvert was a historic structure located southwest of Luana, Iowa, United States. Clayton County built a number bridges over rivers, streams and ditches around the turn of the 20th-century. They contracted with Frank Boyle to build this single stone arch culvert of native limestone in 1899. The culvert was listed on the National Register of Historic Places in 1998. It has subsequently been replaced.

References

Infrastructure completed in 1899
Bridges in Clayton County, Iowa
National Register of Historic Places in Clayton County, Iowa
Road bridges on the National Register of Historic Places in Iowa
Arch bridges in Iowa
Stone bridges in the United States